Cabin John Parkway is an automobile parkway in the US state of Maryland. The parkway runs  from Clara Barton Parkway in Cabin John north to Interstate 495 (I-495) in Bethesda in southwestern Montgomery County. Cabin John Parkway is a four-lane freeway that serves as a connector between Clara Barton Parkway in the direction of Washington DC and I-495 in the direction of Rockville and Silver Spring. The parkway was constructed in the mid-1960s and passes under the historic Union Arch Bridge, the longest masonry arch span in America.

Route description

Cabin John Parkway begins at a partial interchange with Clara Barton Parkway in the unincorporated area of Cabin John. The interchange allows access from southbound Cabin John Parkway to eastbound Clara Barton Parkway and from westbound Clara Barton Parkway to northbound Cabin John Parkway. Each direction of the parkway crosses Cabin John Creek before the roadways come together to pass under the Union Arch Bridge, which carries the Washington Aqueduct and MacArthur Boulevard. Cabin John Parkway crosses Cabin John Creek again before continuing north as a four-lane freeway with a speed limit of  through a forested corridor paralleling the creek. After crossing Booze Creek, the two directions of the parkway divide toward their terminuses at I-495 (Capital Beltway) in Bethesda. The northbound direction of the Cabin John Parkway splits into single-lane ramps for northbound I-495 and I-495's interchange with Maryland Route 190 (MD 190; River Road). The southbound parkway is formed by ramps from southbound I-495 and MD 190.

Cabin John Parkway is maintained by the Maryland State Highway Administration and has an internal designation of Interstate 495X (I-495X). Trucks are prohibited on the parkway. Cabin John Parkway is a part of the National Highway System as a principal arterial for its entire length.

History

Construction on Cabin John Parkway began in 1962 when I-495's bridge across Cabin John Creek and the southbound ramp to the parkway was built. Work on the remainder of the parkway was underway by 1963. Cabin John Parkway opened in 1965 when the Clara Barton Parkway (then known as the Maryland portion of the George Washington Parkway) from the Cabin John interchange east to the MacArthur Boulevard interchange opened.

Exit list

See also

References

External links

Bethesda, Maryland
Cabin John, Maryland
Interstate 495X (Cabin John Parkway)
Cabin John Parkway